The women's 48 kg judo competition at the 1996 Summer Olympics in Atlanta involved 23 competitors, limited to judoka whose body weight was less than, or equal to, . Competition occurred on July 26, 1996 at the Georgia World Congress Center.

Kye Sun-Hui of North Korea, at age 16, surprised spectators by winning gold, upsetting the overwhelming favorite, Ryoko Tamura of Japan, in the final. She had obtained a wildcard entry to the Games, and was virtually unknown on the international stage, having never previously competing outside of her home country.

Results
The gold and silver medalists were determined by the final match of the main single-elimination bracket.

Repechage
The losing semifinalists as well as those judoka eliminated in earlier rounds by the four semifinalists of the main bracket advanced to the repechage.  These matches determined the two bronze medalists for the event.

References

External links
 

W48
Judo at the Summer Olympics Women's Extra Lightweight
Olympics W48
Judo